Thanunchai Baribarn (born October 3, 1972) is a Thai retired professional footballer who played as a midfielder for the Thailand national team from 1999 to 2002, in various tournaments such as the 1999 Southeast Asian Games, the 2000 King's Cup and the Asian Cup in 2000 and 2002. He scored 6 goals for the national team.

International career

International goals

Honours

International
Thailand
 Sea Games 
  Gold Medal (1) : 1999

External links
 

1972 births
Living people
Thanunchai Baribarn
Thanunchai Baribarn
Association football midfielders
Thanunchai Baribarn
Thanunchai Baribarn
Thanunchai Baribarn
Thanunchai Baribarn
Thanunchai Baribarn
2000 AFC Asian Cup players
Southeast Asian Games medalists in football
Thanunchai Baribarn
Competitors at the 1999 Southeast Asian Games